Michael Patrick Mornane (16 February 1886 – 6 March 1939) was an Australian rules footballer who played with Fitzroy in the Victorian Football League (VFL).

Notes

External links 

1886 births
1939 deaths
Australian rules footballers from Melbourne
Fitzroy Football Club players